Tropidia viridifusca, commonly known as the dark crown orchid, is an evergreen, terrestrial plant with thin, pleated, dark green leaves on a thin, upright stem with up to seven green and brown flowers crowded on a short flowering stem on top. It is only known from three Pacific Islands near Australia.

Description
The leaves have three prominent veins. Flowering occurs between December and January.

Taxonomy and naming
Tropidia viridifusca was first formally described in 1929 by Friedrich Wilhelm Ludwig Kraenzlin and the description was published in Vierteljahrsschrift der Naturforschenden Gesellschaft in Zürich. The specific epithet (viridifusca) is derived from the Latin words viridis meaning "green" and fuscus meaning "dusky" or "tawny".

Distribution and habitat
The dark crown is only known from Grande Terre in New Caledonia, Vanuatu and Norfolk Island where it grows on slopes in shady forest.

References

viridifusca
Plants described in 1929
Terrestrial orchids
Orchids of Australia
Orchids of Oceania